Peijnenburg is a surname. Notable people with the surname include:

Maarten Peijnenburg (born 1997), Dutch footballer 
Rinus Peijnenburg (1928–1979), Dutch politician
Roland Peijnenburg, owner of De Zwaan (restaurant)

Dutch-language surnames